Nazmi Mustafa (6 January 1924 – 21 August 1997) was an Albanian politician from Kosovo, he is best known for his time as the mayor of Pristina, Kosovo from 1972–1978.

Other political and social activities 

Member of Provincial Parliament of the Autonomous Socialist Province of Kosovo.
Member of Provincial Committee.
Vice-President of the Society of Technicians and Engineers of Yugoslavia. 
Kosovo's Representative in the Central Parliament.

1924 births
1997 deaths
Mayors of Pristina
Yugoslav politicians